Jennifer Natalya Pritzker (born James Nicholas Pritzker; August 13, 1950) is an American investor, philanthropist, and member of the Pritzker family. Pritzker retired as a lieutenant colonel from the Illinois Army National Guard (ILARNG) in 2001, and was later made an honorary Illinois colonel. Founder of the Tawani Foundation in 1995, Tawani Enterprises in 1996, and the Pritzker Military Library in 2003, Pritzker has been devoted to civic applications of inherited and accrued wealth, including significant donations to broaden understanding and support for "citizen soldiers."

In August 2013, Pritzker released a statement to employees at Tawani Enterprises and the Pritzker Military Library that subsequently received wide media coverage, indicating the change from "J. N." to "Jennifer Natalya" to reflect her status as a transgender woman, making her the first and only openly transgender billionaire.

Early life
She was born James Nicholas Pritzker to Robert Pritzker and Audrey (née Gilbert) Pritzker in Chicago, Illinois. She grew up as a member of the Jewish Pritzker family as the granddaughter of family patriarch A.N. Pritzker. She has two siblings, Linda Pritzker (b. 1953) and Karen Pritzker Vlock (b. 1958). Her parents divorced in 1979, and she has two half-siblings, Matthew Pritzker and Liesel Pritzker Simmons, from the remarriage of her father, Robert, to Irene Dryburgh in 1980. (Her mother also remarried, to Albert B. Ratner in 1981).

Military career
Pritzker says her most memorable experiences in life were in Israel in October 1973 when she witnessed events of the Yom Kippur War. Pritzker enlisted in the U.S. Army on February 8, 1974, and served with the HQ Troop, and with the B Troop, 1st Squadron, 17th Cavalry Regiment, 82nd Airborne Division based at Fort Bragg, North Carolina, rising to the rank of Sergeant. Pritzker's roles while enlisted included aviation repair parts clerk, rifleman, and fire team leader.

After completing military service in February 1977, Pritzker enrolled at Loyola University of Chicago, majoring in history, and entered its Army Reserve Officers' Training Corps program. Pritzker graduated with a BA in History in May 1979, and received commission as an Army officer that same month.

Pritzker first served with the 1st Battalion, 503rd Infantry Regiment, 101st Airborne Division based at Fort Campbell, Kentucky, with duty assignments that included leading rifle and TOW platoons, and time in the Commandant Division, and the Anti-Armor School. Pritzker served as a staff officer with the VII Corps at Kelley Barracks, in Germany, from 1984–1985. Her active duty ended in 1985. After 16 years in the Army Reserves and Illinois Army National Guard, Pritzker retired from the Army National Guard as a lieutenant colonel, in 2001. After retiring, Pritzker was made an honorary Illinois colonel.

While serving, Pritzker was awarded the Meritorious Service Medal, the Army Commendation Medal with Oak Leaf Cluster, the Army Achievement Medal with Oak Leaf Cluster, the Good Conduct Medal, the Army Reserve Components Achievement Medal with 3 Oak Leaf Clusters, the National Defense Service Medal with Star, the Antarctic Service Medal, the Outstanding Military Volunteer Service Medal, the Armed Forces Reserve Medal with 20 year Device, the NCO Professional Development Ribbon, the Army Service Ribbon, the Army Reserve Component Overseas Training Ribbon, the State of Louisiana Legion of Merit, the State of Illinois Long and Honorable Service Medal with Oak Leaf Cluster, the State of Illinois Military Attendance Ribbon with Numeral 7, the U.S. Army Parachute Badge and the Air Assault Badge.

Pritzker earned airborne badges from Israel, Russia, Canada, the Netherlands, and Great Britain, as well as from Poland; according to Steven Mrozek, "Most memorable of these was a parachute jump at the North Pole with the Russians in 1993."

Business career
Pritzker has founded or served with a number of business and philanthropic organizations. In 1996, she incorporated Tawani Enterprises, where she served as president and CEO, a business entity with current stated purpose as a "private wealth management company established to manage the personal wealth, philanthropic endeavors, and military interests ... " Interests of the company include significant Chicago real estate holdings. In 1995, Pritzker created the Tawani Foundation, and in 2003, she founded the Pritzker Military Library, both dedicated to the understanding and support of the "citizen soldier." In addition, Pritzker serves as Chairwoman of the Board of the Connecticut-based private equity firm Squadron Capital LLC, in which she has been identified a principal investor. Finally, Pritzker has served as Special Projects Director for the National Strategy Forum, as Chairman of the Board and co-owner of National Security Ltd. (1988–1995), and is active in number of further philanthropic enterprises.

In 2016, Jennifer Pritzker was presented the Bonham Centre Award from The Mark S. Bonham Centre for Sexual Diversity Studies, University of Toronto, for her contributions to the advancement and education of issues around sexual identification.

Family businesses
Jennifer Pritzker's father Robert, and Robert's brothers Jay and Donald, built and diversified a Chicago-based family business, the Marmon Group, into a holding company of more than 60 diverse industrial corporations; they also created the Hyatt Hotel chain in 1957, and owned Braniff Airlines from 1983–1988. The family later began divesting of many of these assets. In 2006, the family sold Conwood, a smokeless tobacco company, for $3.5 billion to cigarette company Reynolds American Inc. In 2007, the family sold a 60% stake, and sold control of the Marmon Group to Berkshire Hathaway for $4.5 billion, a sale that it completed in 2013. In 2010, the family sold its majority stake in Transunion, the Chicago-based credit reporting company, to Chicago-based private-equity firm Madison Dearborn Partners for an undisclosed amount. As a member of the Robert's line of the Pritzker family, Jennifer Prizker has inherited and accumulated wealth that is estimated at US$1.7 billion.

Philanthropy
Pritzker created the Tawani Foundation in 1995, which aims "to enhance the awareness and understanding of the importance of the Citizen Soldier; to preserve unique sites of significance to American and military history; to foster health and wellness projects for improved quality of life; and to honor the service of military personnel, past, present and future." In 2003, the Tawani Foundation made a $1.35 million donation to the Palm Center at the University of California, Santa Barbara, to study the feasibility of transgender people serving in the military and in the ranks of police and fire departments. In 2013, the Foundation donated $25 million to Norwich University, in Northfield, Vermont, the school credited with developing and establishing the first Reserve Officers' Training Corps (ROTC) program in the country. So closely tied is this founder to the Foundation, that news reports of the Foundation's gifts refer to Jennifer Pritzker and the Foundation, interchangeably, as being the donor (e.g., in the Norwich gift). In 2016, through her Foundation, Pritzker gave a $2 million donation to create the world's first endowed academic chair of transgender studies, at the University of Victoria in British Columbia; Aaron Devor was chosen as the inaugural chair.

Political causes
Pritzker was a Republican, and major donor to candidates and organizations such as the NRA, John McCain, and Mitt Romney. However, as of 2019, she is reevaluating her support, citing the Trump Administration's transgender military ban and other anti-LGBTQ policies: "When the GOP asks me to deliver six- or seven-figure contributions for the 2020 elections, my first response will be: why should I contribute to my own destruction?”.

In August 2020, Pritzker donated $2,000 to the presidential campaign of Joe Biden.

In October 2020, Pritzker donated $100,000 to the Lincoln Project, led by Republican Strategists, some of whom endorse Joe Biden to prevent the re-election of Donald Trump.

During the 3rd quarter of 2020, Pritzker was recognized as a member of the Chairman's Circle, signifying a $25,000 contribution to the Libertarian Party.

Personal life
Pritzker has a daughter, Tal Hava Pritzker, from a first marriage to Ayelet Pritzker, and two sons, Andrew (b. 1991) and William, from her marriage to Lisa I. Goren. , she was divorced.

On August 16, 2013, a statement was released to employees at Tawani Enterprises and the Pritzker Military Library indicating Pritzker to be the world's first transgender billionaire; the announcement read:

On October 31, 2020, Jennifer N. Pritzker married Erin E. Solaro.

References

External links

Colonel (Hon.) (IL) Jennifer N. Pritzker at the Pritzker Military Museum & Library
Tawani Foundation

1950 births
American billionaires
American LGBT military personnel
American nonprofit executives
American women company founders
American company founders
Businesspeople from Chicago
Female billionaires
Jewish American philanthropists
Illinois National Guard personnel
Illinois Republicans
LGBT conservatism in the United States
LGBT people from Illinois
Living people
Loyola University Chicago alumni
National Guard (United States) officers
Philanthropists from Illinois
Jennifer N.
Transgender Jews
Transgender military personnel
Transgender women
United States Army officers
United States Army soldiers
21st-century American Jews
21st-century American women